Bayou Castine is a stream in the U.S. state of Louisiana.

Name
Bayou Castine is a name derived from the Choctaw language meaning "river of fleas".

Variant names are:
Bayou Castin
Big Bayou Castin
Castein
Castein Bayou
Castein Bayouque
Casteinbayouque
Castembayouque
Castimbayouque
Castin Bayou
Castine Bayou
Le Petit Castaing

References

Rivers of Louisiana
Rivers of St. Tammany Parish, Louisiana